Xénia Krizsán (born 13 January 1993) is a Hungarian athlete who specialises in the heptathlon.

Krizsán won the silver medal at the 2012 World Junior Championships with a personal best of 5957 points.

International competitions

References

External links 

 
 
 
 
 

1993 births
Living people
Hungarian heptathletes
World Athletics Championships athletes for Hungary
Athletes (track and field) at the 2016 Summer Olympics
Olympic athletes of Hungary
Athletes from Budapest
Athletes (track and field) at the 2020 Summer Olympics
20th-century Hungarian women
21st-century Hungarian women